Sleeve gastrectomy is a surgical weight-loss procedure in which the stomach is reduced to about 15% of its original size, by surgical removal of a large portion of the stomach along the greater curvature. The result is a sleeve or tube like structure. The procedure permanently reduces the size of the stomach, although there could be some dilation of the stomach later on in life. The procedure is generally performed laparoscopically and is irreversible.

A meta-analysis of 174,772 participants published in The Lancet in 2021 found that bariatric surgery was associated with 59% and 30% reduction in all-cause mortality among obese adults with or without type 2 diabetes respectively. This meta-analysis also found that median life-expectancy was 9.3 years longer for obese adults with diabetes who received bariatric surgery as compared to routine (non-surgical) care, whereas the life expectancy gain was 5.1 years longer for obese adults without diabetes.

Procedure 
Sleeve gastrectomy was originally performed as a modification to another bariatric procedure, the duodenal switch, and then later as the first part of a two-stage gastric bypass operation on extremely obese patients for whom the risk of performing gastric bypass surgery was deemed too large. The initial weight loss in these patients was so successful it began to be investigated as a stand-alone procedure.

Sleeve gastrectomy is the most commonly performed bariatric surgery worldwide. In many cases, sleeve gastrectomy is as effective as gastric bypass surgery, including improvements in glucose homeostasis before substantial weight loss has occurred. This weight-loss independent benefit is related to the decrease in gastric volume, changes in gut peptides, and expression of genes involved in glucose absorption. 

The procedure involves a longitudinal resection of the stomach starting from the antrum at the point 5–6 cm from the pylorus and finishing at the fundus close to the cardia. The remaining gastric sleeve is calibrated with a bougie. Most surgeons prefer to use a bougie between 36 and 40 Fr with the procedure and the ideal approximate remaining size of the stomach after the procedure is about 150 mL.

Use in children and adolescents 
Endorsed by the International Federation for the Surgery of Obesity and Metabolic Disorders and the American Society for Metabolic and Bariatric Surgery, sleeve gastrectomy is gaining popularity in children and adolescents. Studies by Alqahtani and colleagues have found that sleeve gastrectomy causes large weight loss in children and adolescents aged 5 to 21 years. Moreover, they compared weight loss with adults and found comparable weight loss. Recent reports from the group show that growth progresses unaffected after sleeve gastrectomy in children younger than 14 years of age. Depression following the procedure has been noted in some individuals. Another side effect is insomnia. After this surgery many people can only sleep when they take melatonin or sleeping medications.

Complications 
Sleeve gastrectomy may cause complications; some of them are listed below:
 Sleeve leaking (occurs 1 in 200 patients)
 Blood clots (happens 1% of the time)
 Wound infections (occurs in about 10 to 15% of post-op patients)
 Strictures (occurs in 3.5% of post-op patients)
 Aversion to food, and nausea
 Damage to the vagus nerve which will cause constant nausea
 Gastroparesis, with a delay in moving food from the stomach to the small intestine
 Vomiting
 Internal bleeding
 Esophageal spasm/pain
 Gastroesophageal Reflux Disease (GERD)
 Depression after surgery

References

Further reading

External links 
 

Surgical removal procedures
Bariatrics
Obesity
Digestive system procedures